The 1939–40 New York Americans season was the Americans' 15th season of play.

Offseason

Regular season

Final standings

Record vs. opponents

Game log

Playoffs
The Americans met the Detroit in a best-of-three series and lost the series in 2 games, or 1–2.

Player stats

Regular season
Scoring

Goaltending

Playoffs
Scoring

Goaltending

Awards and records

Transactions

See also
1939–40 NHL season

References

External links
 

New York Americans seasons
New York
New York
New York Amer
New York Amer
1930s in Manhattan
1940s in Manhattan
Madison Square Garden